Peta-Gaye Gayle (born 19 January 1979) is a retired female track and field sprinter from Jamaica, who competed in the 400 m hurdles during her career. Her personal best time in the women's 400 m hurdles is 55.92, set on 22 July 2001 in Guatemala City.

Achievements

References

1979 births
Living people
Jamaican female sprinters
Jamaican female hurdlers
Athletes (track and field) at the 2007 Pan American Games
Pan American Games competitors for Jamaica
World Athletics Championships medalists
20th-century Jamaican women
21st-century Jamaican women